The BMW 109-558 is a liquid fuelled sustainer rocket motor developed by BMW at their Bruckmühl facility, in Germany during the Second World War.

The 109-558 (with the "109-" prefix being the Reichsluftfahrtministerium, or RLM, designation for  reaction-propulsion aircraft power projects, encompassing all jet & rocket engine designs) was designed as a sustainer rocket for the Henschel Hs 117 surface-to-air missile. The engine had a compressed air tank to pressurise tanks for the R-Stoff fuel (50% triethylamine and 50% xylidine) and SV-Stoff oxidiser (94% nitric acid with 6% dinitrogen tetroxide). SV-Stoff was used to cool the combustion chamber.

Production of the 109-558 took forty to sixty hours using a very high proportion of slave labour.

Applications
 Henschel Hs 117
 Henschel Hs 117H

Specifications

Notes

Sources
Christopher, John.  The Race for Hitler's X-Planes.  The Mill, Gloucestershire:  History Press, 2013.

BMW aircraft engines
BMW rocket engines